Lalrammuana (born 18 February 1996) is an Indian professional footballer who plays as a midfielder for Shillong Lajong in the I-League.

Career
Born in Mizoram, Lalrammuana was a part of the youth team of Shillong Lajong before being including in the first-team squad before the 2013–14 I-League season. He made his professional debut for the club on 23 February 2014 against United. He came on as an 83rd-minute substitute for Lalram Luaha as Shillong Lajong drew the match 2–2.

Lalrammuana started to blossom as a footballer during the 2016 Shillong Premier League. He scored a hat-trick for Shillong Lajong in the SPL against Langsning on 13 September 2016 in a match that Lajong won 5–2. His performance in this match and during October helped earn him the player of the month award for Shillong Lajong, at that point with seven goals during the season. Finally, on 9 November 2016, it was Lalrammuana's brace which helped Shillong Lajong win their third straight Shillong Premier League title as the club defeated Rangdajied United 3–2 in the SPL final.

International
Lalrammuana played for India U16 team in the 2012 AFC U-16 Championship.

Career statistics

Honours

Club
Shillong Lajong
 Shillong Premier League: 2016

References

External links 
 Shillong Lajong Profile.
 Profile at Goal.com
 Profile at I-league.org

1996 births
Living people
People from Mizoram
Indian footballers
Shillong Lajong FC players
Association football midfielders
Footballers from Mizoram
I-League players
Shillong Premier League players
India youth international footballers